Educando a Nina is a Mexican telenovela produced by Joshua Mintz that premiered on Azteca Uno on 12 March 2018 and concluded on 4 August 2018. The telenovela it is an adaptation of the Argentina drama of the same name produced by Telefe in 2016. It stars Cynthia Rodríguez as the titular character.

Plot 
Two twin sisters are separated at birth and lead opposite lives ignoring the existence of the other. The history of both will change radically when they are forced to live the life of their sister. Thirty years ago, Manuel, owner of a prestigious publishing house, is a married man but has a clandestine history with Luisa, a beautiful dancer. Luisa who becomes pregnant and to not complicate the marriage of Manuel disappears and takes refuge in his brother José. Luisa gives birth to twins and dies in childbirth. José refuses to give the girls to their father because he blames Manuel for the death of his sister. However, he can not keep them both. José notifies Manuel that he is a father, but he only gives him one girl and hides the existence of her twin, whom José appropriates and names her as Nina, his biological daughter. Nina, along with her best friend Susy, are choristers of "Daddy Papi", the king of the reggeton, with whom she has a very passionate love relationship. Together with them the musicians and her father José, live in the pension of Meche, the mother of Daddy Papi. Mara lives with Manuel and his new partner, Andrea, a much younger woman. Mara is in the direction of a female magazine of the publishing house of her father, although she does not work. Who takes charge is Patricio, her best friend and Manuel's right hand.

Cast 
 Cynthia Rodríguez as Nina Peralta/Mara dos Puertas
 Antonio Gaona as Luca Aguirre
 Alex Sirvent as Antonio Aguirre
 Wendy de los Cobos as Mercedes "Meche" Lara
 Marco Treviño as Manuel dos Puertas
 Martha Cristiana as Andrea dos Puertas
 Rodolfo Valdés as Patricio Arenas
 Alejandro Ibarra as Salomón
 Darío Ripoll as Van Damme
 Estefanía Hinojosa as Susana "Susy" Contreras
 David Palacio as Lalo "El Daddy Papi"
 Gimena Gómez as Sofía
 Pilar Ixquic Mata as Selva
 Vanessa Terkes as Magaly
 Marina Ruiz as Perla
 Erika Fernández as Graciela
 Jimmy Quijano as Moronas
 Fernanda Tosky as Carmela
 Erika García as Janine
 Juan Felipe Pulido as El Tattoo
 Luis Fernando Peña as Beto
 Mariana Ávila as Milagros (Mili)
 Oswaldo Zárate as Micky
 Pepe Valdivieso as Leo
 Óscar Olivares as Blondy
 Luis Miguel Villoslada as Tiago Martínez del Campo
 Jorge Emilio as Andy
 Arturo Ríos as José Peralta

Rating

References

External links 
 

2018 telenovelas
TV Azteca telenovelas
2018 Mexican television series debuts
2018 Mexican television series endings
Mexican telenovelas
Mexican television series based on Argentine television series